Primer Impacto (First Impact) is a Spanish-language television news program broadcast by Univision weekdays at 5pm ET//4pm CT. A later program at 11pm ET/PT (Primer Impacto Extra) airs on Univision affiliates without a local news department (and the national cable feed), leading into the network's 11:30pm newscast, Noticiero Univision Edicion Nocturna.

The show's main anchors are Michelle Galván and Pamela Silva Conde. Verónica Del Castillo is the show's main Mexico City-based anchor, contributing to reports on Mexican-centered stories, and occasionally filling in. Jackie Guerrido is the show's main weather forecaster on weekdays, and also acts as the main fill-in presenter. Univision meteorologist Paola Elorza does the weather on weekends. Both WLTV chief meteorologist Eduardo Rodríguez and Elorza substitute for Guerrido in the case she's sitting in the anchor desk or absent. Félix Fernández and Fernando Fiore present the sports segment, produced by the TUDN sports division.

The show is well known in Latin America for its tabloid format, and a focus on crime and sensationalistic reporting (including broadcasting graphic imagery with little to no censorship), as well as entertainment news and human-interest stories. Another particular element of the show has been the show's set, which, even with rebuilds throughout its history, has always had an anchor desk which deliberately exposes the legs of its anchors, who use revealing clothing purportedly. Being one of the first and foremost tabloid television shows in Latin America, it receives some of the highest ratings for an American Hispanic TV program worldwide, and it has also being criticized by many viewers and media insiders for its content. Such controversy has led to the derogatory monikers "Noticiero de las Piernas" and "Las Noticias Cochinas".

Broadcast history

The program was preceded by Noticias y Más ("News and More") in 1991 with Raul Peimbert and Jackie Nespral anchoring. Nespral left the show later that year and was replaced by Myrka Dellanos. On February 14, 1994, the show was replaced by a new program called Primer Impacto. By this time, Peimbert left Univision, and was replaced by María Celeste Arrarás joining Dellanos as co-host. Arrarás had already substituted for Dellanos on Noticias y Más during a brief period while anchoring Noticiero Univision: Fin de Semana, and she was eventually rehired to co-host the show after being called by the producers.

Primer Impacto rapidly became a success, with both Dellanos and Arrarás becoming a subject for discussion, and the show's content becoming more commented than the content of the more serious Noticiero Univision. Gossip magazines also began commenting on the show's popularity, even including Dellanos and Arrarás in their front pages and even featuring paparazzi reports about the personal lives of both anchors. Even many TV channels in Latin America noticed the success of the show, even creating similar tabloid-focused shows to mixed results.

In 2002, Arrarás left the show in order to give birth to her first child, she also accepted an offer from rival Telemundo to host a competing show, Al Rojo Vivo. She would be replaced as main co-host by Barbara Bermudo. The show also added then-husband-and-wife Fernando del Rincón and Carmen Dominicci as co-anchors of a new late edition, Primer Impacto Extra. In 2004, after 10 years on the show, Myrka Dellanos left the program. In 2005, Carmen Dominicci left the show to anchor the unsuccessful evening newscast of sister network Telefutura, En Vivo y Directo; she would eventually return less than a year later as a fill-in anchor. In 2006, Satcha Pretto joined the program, and would sometimes fill in for Bermudo or Del Rincon whenever they had the day off. In 2007, Colombian-born Ilia Calderón joined the program as a fill-in anchor. Calderón would be elevated as main co-anchor after Fernando del Rincón and Carmen Dominicci were fired from the program and the network in 2008 as a result of allegations made by Dominicci of domestic abuse from Del Rincón. On June 3, 2011 it was announced that Pamela Silva Conde would be joining Primer Impacto, after Ilia Calderón was elevated to be co-anchor of Noticiero Univision Edición Nocturna, which follows Primer Impacto Extra.<ref>{{cite web  | title = Pamela Silva Conde Joins Univision's "Primer Impacto | publisher =Univision | date = 2011-06-03  | url = http://www.univision.net/corp/en/pr/Miami_03062011-2.html  | access-date = 2011-06-06|language=es}}</ref>

"Primer Impacto Extra" Weekend Anchor Satcha Pretto left the program to become the new News Anchor for Despierta America. Natalia Cruz replaced Satcha Pretto.

In 2017, Michelle Galvan replaced Barbara Bermudo, after she left Univision after 14 years as anchor.

Walter Mercado provided the flamboyant astrology predictions for the show.  He announced on January 8, 2010 that he and Univision have parted ways after fifteen years.  Maria Elena Salinas and Edna Schmidt have both had guests co-hosting duties on the show.

Segments

There are various segments in Primer Impacto, the most important are: news of the U.S. and the world, República Deportiva (Sports Republic, now a spin-off weekly program), movies, weather, horoscope (dropped in 2010; returned in 2021), curiosities and the main story of the day.

Current anchors
 Pamela Silva – Co-Anchor, (2011–present)
 Jackie Guerrido – Co-Anchor Weather Forecaster (2004–present)
 Michelle Galván – Co-Anchor (2017–present) Joined Primer Impacto after Barbara’s departure.
 Borja Voces - Co-Anchor (2014–present), host of "Secreto a Voces".
 Victor "Niño Prodigio" Florencio - Astrologer (2021–present)
 Paola Elorza – Co-Anchor Weather Weekends, (February 2000–present) was in a Cientific Investigative Journalism Boot Camp at M.I.T.
 Verónica Del Castillo – also replaces anchors and have reporting duties from Mexico City.

Former on–air staff

† Indicates deceased

 María Celeste Arrarás - Co-Anchor (1992-2002) Host and managing editor of Al Rojo Vivo con María Celeste''
 Carmen Dominicci - Co-Anchor (2002-June 3, 2011) In 2011, she joined as a co-host and correspondent for the "Al Rojo Vivo" news program and joined the special investigative team of Noticias Telemundo.
 Satcha Pretto - Weekend Anchor (July 13, 2006 – 2011) left the program to become the new News Anchor for Univisions Despierta America.
 Myrka Dellanos - Co-Anchor (1992-2004) In 2013, she joined as host and contributor for American-based Hispanic network Estrella TV.
 Ilia Calderón - (March 2007-June 3, 2011) stay on "Noticiero Univision Edición Nocturna."
 Barbara Bermudo - Co-Anchor (2002-January 5, 2017)
 Natalia Cruz - Co-Anchor Weekends, (2011-2018)
 Walter Mercado  †  - Astrologer (1994-2009)

References

External links
 Primer Impacto official site
 

 
Univision original programming
1994 American television series debuts
1990s American television news shows
2000s American television news shows
2010s American television news shows